Al-Anwar is a Libyan football club based in Al-Abyar which plays in the Libyan Premier League.

Al-Anwar
1960 establishments in Libya
Association football clubs established in 1960